The following is about the qualification rules and the quota allocation for the speed skating at the 2018 Winter Olympics.

Qualification rules
A total quota of 180 athletes were allowed to compete at the Games (max. 100 men and max. 80 women). Countries were assigned quotas based on their performance during the 2017–18 ISU Speed Skating World Cup in the autumn of 2017. Each nation was permitted to enter a maximum of three athletes per gender for all events apart from the 5000m, 10000m and mass start events, for which they could enter a maximum of two athletes per event.

Qualification times
The following requisite qualification times were released in June 2017.

Quota allocation
Final Standings after World Cup 4 on 10 December 2017. The "total" column began with 257 based on the maximum which the nation could be allocated from the individual distance allotments, and shrank to 184 by national team nominations and reallocation. On 5 February, the final breakdown of 184 quotas was announced.

Reserves
If a country rejects a quota spot or reduces its team then additional quotas become available. In case of reallocation of unused quotas places, priority will be given to NOC's that have not yet been allocated a quota place for the event. The NOCs that will thus have priority for reallocation of quota places for the respective events are marked with an asterisk (*) in the table below. 
 Men
Quota remaining to reallocate

 Women
Quota remaining to reallocate

Team Pursuit events

Unused Team Pursuit quota places may be provisionally reallocated to the next best placed team based on the Team Pursuit SOQC (Special Olympic Qualifying Classification), as per Rule 209, paragraph 2 d), as follows :

References

Qualification
Qualification for the 2018 Winter Olympics